Chris Cates (born April 15, 1985) is a former minor league shortstop selected by the Minnesota Twins in the 38th round of the 2007 Major League Baseball Draft. He is currently a volunteer assistant coach for the Florida State University Seminoles baseball team. Also he is the manager of the North Adams Steeplecats of the NECBL.

Despite standing only 5'3" tall and weighing just 145 lbs., his junior year he was named Third-Team All-Big East while leading the Louisville Cardinals with a .332 batting average and 47 runs scored.

Cates also played for the North Adams Steeplecats of the New England Collegiate Baseball League, a collegiate summer baseball league. He won the Most Valuable Player award at the 2005 NECBL All-Star Game. He is returning to the North Adams Steeplecats for the summer of 2014 as their manager.

For the season, he batted .251 with 25 runs batted in and 41 runs scored. Cates split 2010 between Fort Myers and New Britain, batting a combined .198. For his career, he batted .228 with 109 RBIs and 163 runs scored. He never hit a professional home run.

References

External links
, or Minor League Baseball

1985 births
Living people
Elizabethton Twins players
Fort Myers Miracle players
Beloit Snappers players
New Britain Rock Cats players
Louisville Cardinals baseball players
Florida State Seminoles baseball coaches
Tampa Spartans baseball coaches
South Florida Bulls baseball coaches
High school baseball coaches in the United States